Ladle Cove is a designated place in the Canadian province of Newfoundland and Labrador. It is along the Straight Shore on the island of Newfoundland.

History 
The first settlers in Ladle Cove are believed to have been Samuel and Tobias Pinsent who stayed for the winter in 1862. The first land grant was issued to the Methodist board of education in 1876; the next grant was given to the West Brothers in 1877. By 1869 there were 48 people living in the cove. Some of these people would spend their summer on the Offer Wadham Islands fishing. In the 1880s Ladle Cove was shipping surplus vegetables from their fertile soil to other communities. The first post office was in Abraham Tulk's home around the year 1885 and it remained there until 1919 when a Martha Stratton had it in her home. The postoffice was built in 1925. The population in 1951 was 176.

Church history
Although most of the population in the beginning of settlement were Church of England, there was no Church of England church. The first Methodist school-chapel in Ladle Cove was opened in 1884 and the first minister was either James Wilson, or A.J. Cheeseman. Between 1862 and 1874 ministers from Greenspond and Fogo visited to perform services, baptisms, burials and marriages. From 1874 to 1884 the ministers came from Musgrave Harbour until Ladle Cove got its own church and fell under the Musgrave circuit. In 1894 a new church was opened by Thomas Darby.

Geography 
Ladle Cove is in Newfoundland within Subdivision L of Division No. 8.

It is in on Notre Dame Bay near Musgrave Harbour on Hamilton Sound. Ladle Cove is close to good fishing grounds and fishing grounds off the Wadham Islands. It also attracted settlers because the soil is fertile enough for growing vegetables.

Demographics 

Economy 
In the early years on Ladle Cove the settlers fished for cod in Ladle Cove or on Peckford and Wadham Islands, and the cod was sold to Fogo or St. John's. They also hunted for food and grew their own vegetables. The lobster fishery was also important, and the Tulks operated a lobster factory in Ladle Cove. There was also some small-scale sealing, herring and salmon catching, and logging (since the early 1900s) in Ladle Cove.

Education 
The first teaching in Ladle Cove was done by Louisa Wellon in 1875 in her fathers store. The first school was located on the same land as the church when the land was granted to the Methodist Board of Education in 1876. The school started in 1878 with William Bradley as the first teacher. A new one room school opened in 1904 with Edwin Baker as the teacher.

See also 
List of communities in Newfoundland and Labrador
List of designated places in Newfoundland and Labrador

References

External links 
 http://ngb.chebucto.org/ 
 http://www.ucs.mun.ca/~hrollman/index.html

Populated coastal places in Canada
Designated places in Newfoundland and Labrador